Branched chain fatty acids (BCFA) are usually saturated fatty acids with one or more methyl branches on the carbon chain. BCFAs are most often found in bacteria, but can be found in Nattō, dairy, vernix caseosa of human infants and California sea lions where they may play a role in fostering the development of their intestinal microbiota. Another waxy animal material containing BCFAs is lanolin.
The content of branched chain fatty acids is considered to be responsible for the smell of mutton and higher content causes consumers to dislike the smell of lamb meat.
Branched chain fatty acids are synthesized by the branch-chain fatty acid synthesizing system.

References 

Fatty acids